Mongol HD TV is a television broadcaster in Mongolia.

It was established in 2009 by Chinbat Lkhagva after the acquisition of a license for approximately US$402 million.

The channel also broadcasts a popular show, Mongolia's Got Talent.

References

See also
Media of Mongolia
Communications in Mongolia

Television companies of Mongolia